Marvin Sidney Hill (1928–2016) was a professor of American history at Brigham Young University (BYU) and a historian of the Latter Day Saint movement.

Biography 
Born on August 28, 1928, Hill completed his Master of Arts in history at BYU in 1955. He received a PhD in American intellectual history from the University of Chicago in 1968 and studied under Martin E. Marty and wrote his dissertation on Christian primitivism and Mormonism. Hill attended the University of Chicago at the same time as Dallin H. Oaks, and their mutual interest in the murder of the Mormon founder Joseph Smith in Illinois led to a ten-year research effort. Together, they published the book Carthage Conspiracy: The Trial of the Accused Assassins of Joseph Smith in 1975 while both were working at BYU, Hill as a professor of history and Oaks as the president of BYU. It won the Mormon History Association's best book award for 1976.

Hill was a professor of American history at BYU starting in the 1960s. In 1972, he took leave from BYU to accept a post-doctoral research fellowship at Yale University. He has also served as president of the Mormon History Association and on the board of editors of the Journal of Mormon History.

In Mormon studies, Hill was a well-known proponent of the new Mormon history and advocated a "middle ground" approach that did not seek to describe Mormonism as authentic or fraudulent.

Hill married Lila Foster in 1953. They had six children and lived in Provo, Utah. He was the brother of Donna Hill (1921–2007), the author of the noted 1977 biography Joseph Smith, the First Mormon. He died in Pleasant Grove, Utah, on July 27, 2016.

Awards 
 1975: Best Book Award for Carthage Conspiracy with Dallin H. Oaks (Mormon History Association)
 1977: Best Article By a Senior Author for "The Kirtland Economy Revisited" with C. Keith Rooker and Larry T. Wimmer (Mormon History Association)
 1989: Best Book Award for Quest for Refuge (Mormon History Association)

Writings

Books 

  Published concurrently in BYU Studies 17.

Articles

Other

References

External links 
 The Marvin S. Hill papers at the University of Utah
 
 Photograph of Marvin Hill

1928 births
2016 deaths
American Latter Day Saint writers
Brigham Young University alumni
Brigham Young University faculty
Historians of the Latter Day Saint movement
Latter Day Saints from Illinois
Latter Day Saints from Massachusetts
Latter Day Saints from Utah
University of Chicago alumni
Writers from Provo, Utah